Fabián Steven Ángel Bernal (born January 10, 2001) is a Colombian footballer who currently plays as a midfielder for Newell's Old Boys, on loan from Atlético Junior.

Career statistics

Club

Notes

References

2001 births
Living people
Colombian footballers
Colombian expatriate footballers
People from Sogamoso
Colombia youth international footballers
Association football midfielders
Sportspeople from Boyacá Department
Barranquilla F.C. footballers
Atlético Junior footballers
Newell's Old Boys footballers
Categoría Primera B players
Argentine Primera División players
Colombian expatriate sportspeople in Argentina
Expatriate footballers in Argentina